The Groote Park Murder is a 1923 detective novel by Freeman Wills Crofts, one of the leading figures of the Golden Age of Detective Fiction. It was one of several stand-alone novels Crofts wrote following his successful debut The Cask, before creating the character of Chief Inspector French who debuted the following year in Inspector French's Greatest Case.

Synopsis
When a dead body is found in a railway tunnel in South Africa, the local police investigation at first points towards an accidental death. However, a second almost identical killing in the Scottish Highlands appears to point towards murder.

References

Bibliography
 Evans, Curtis. Masters of the "Humdrum" Mystery: Cecil John Charles Street, Freeman Wills Crofts, Alfred Walter Stewart and the British Detective Novel, 1920-1961. McFarland, 2014.
 Reilly, John M. Twentieth Century Crime & Mystery Writers. Springer, 2015.

1923 British novels
Novels by Freeman Wills Crofts
British crime novels
British mystery novels
British detective novels
William Collins, Sons books
Novels set in Scotland
Novels set in South Africa